Shuto Con was an annual three day anime convention held during March at the Radisson Hotel Lansing at the Capitol in Lansing, Michigan. The convention's name stands for Capital City Convention. The organizers have also hosted Random Battle Con, a video game convention.

Programming
The convention typically offered an anime viewing room, artist alley, costume competition, dealers, gaming rooms, video game tournaments. Gaming ran 24-hours during the convention.

In 2011, the convention raised $2200 for 2011 Tōhoku earthquake and tsunami charities, and in 2012 supported the Greater Lansing Food Bank. 2018's charity ball benefited End Violent Encounters.

History
Organizers of the first convention planned for 300 attendees, with 1,300 showing up. In 2012, the convention used all rooms in the Radisson Hotel. In both the first and second year, due to high attendance, the convention ran out of badges and lanyards. Shuto Con in 2014 had an attendance limit of 7,000 people. Gaming was relocated to the convention center in 2016. The convention fills all hotel rooms in the Radisson, along with several others as of 2017.

Event history

References

Defunct anime conventions
Recurring events established in 2011
2011 establishments in Michigan
Annual events in Michigan
Film festivals in Michigan
Tourist attractions in Lansing, Michigan
Conventions in Michigan